is a passenger railway station in the city of Anan, Tokushima Prefecture, Japan. It is operated by JR Shikoku and has the station number "M09".

Lines

Layout
The station consists of an island platform serving two tracks. The station building houses a waiting room and a JR ticket window (without a Midori no Madoguchi facility). Access to the island platform is by means of a level crossing and ramp. A passing loop and siding branch off track 2.

Platforms

Adjacent stations

History
Hanoura Station was opened on 15 December 1916 along a stretch of track laid down by the privately run  from Chūden to Hanoura and Furushō. On 1 July 1936, the Anan Railway was nationalized and the track from Chūden to Hanoura became part of the Mugi Line. The track to Furushō became a branch line. Passenger services were stopped and it was used for freight only. Freight operations stopped on 1 Jul 1943, restarted on 10 May 1950 and finally ceased altogether on 1 April 1961. Thereafter the branch line track was removed.

On 1 April 1987, with the privatization of Japanese National Railways (JNR), the successor of JGR, JR Shikoku took over control of Hanoura Station.

Passenger statistics
In fiscal 2019, the station was used by an average of 1036 passengers daily

Surrounding area
Anan City Hall Hanoura Branch
Anan City Hanoura Library
Anan City Hanoura Public Hall
Anan City Hanoura Elementary School
Anan City Hanoura Junior High School

See also
List of railway stations in Japan

References

External links

 JR Shikoku timetable

Railway stations in Tokushima Prefecture
Railway stations in Japan opened in 1916
Anan, Tokushima